This article lists all the confirmed national football squads for the 1987 European Competition for Women's Football.

Players marked (c) were named as captain for their national squad.

Head coach:  Martin Reagan

Head coach:  Ettore Recagni

Head coach:  Erling Hokstad

Head coach:  Ulf Lyfors

Source: Swedish Football Association

References

External links
 1987 – Match Details at RSSSF.com

UEFA Women's Championship squads
Squads